Populus euphratica, commonly known as the Euphrates poplar, desert poplar, diversiform-leaved poplar, or poplar diversifolia, is a species of poplar tree in the willow family.

Description

The Euphrates poplar is a medium-sized deciduous tree that may grow to a height of about and a girth of  where conditions are favorable.  The stem is typically bent and forked; old stems have thick, rough, olive-green bark.  While the sapwood is white, the heartwood is red, darkening to almost black at the center. The roots spread widely but not deeply. The leaves are highly variable in shape.  

Distribution and habitat
The species has a very wide range, occurring naturally from North Africa, across the Middle East and Central Asia to western China.

It is a prominent component of Tugay floodplain ecosystems along river valleys in arid and semi-arid regions, mixed with willow, tamarisk and mulberry in dense thickets. It grows well on land that is seasonally flooded and is tolerant of saline and brackish water.  Much used as a source of firewood, its forests have largely disappeared or become fragmented over much of its natural range.

Uses
The species is used in agroforestry to provide leaves as fodder for livestock, timber and, potentially, fiber for making paper. It is also used in afforestation programs on saline soils in desert regions, and to create windbreaks and check erosion. The bark is reported to have Anthelmintic properties.

References

euphratica
Trees of Asia
Flora of Iraq
Flora of Jordan
Flora of Egypt
Flora of Syria
Plants described in 1807